David John Eadie (2 January 1975 – 7 May 2011) was a South African first-class cricketer.

Eadie was born at Cape Town in January 1975. He was educated at the Diocesan College, before going up to St Edmund Hall, Oxford as a Rhodes Scholar in 1996. While studying at Oxford, Eadie played first-class cricket for Oxford University in 1998 and 1999, making a total of ten appearances. These included eight matches against county opposition and two against Cambridge University in The University Match. Eadie scored a total of 192 runs in his ten matches, at an average of 19.20 and a high score of 68 not out, which was one of two half centuries he made. With his right-arm medium pace, he took 16 wickets at a bowling average of 37.62, with best figures of 3 for 57. Eadie also played field hockey for Oxford. 

After graduating from Oxford, Eadie returned to South Africa. He died at Mouille Point in Cape Town on 7 May 2011, after falling into a state of delirium while on a night out and jumping over railings into the sea, hitting his head on the rocks below.

References

External links

1975 births
2011 deaths
Cricketers from Cape Town
Alumni of Diocesan College, Cape Town
South African Rhodes Scholars
Alumni of St Edmund Hall, Oxford
South African cricketers
Oxford University cricketers
Accidental deaths in South Africa
Accidental deaths from falls